Luciano Castillo Colonna (23 February 1899 – 22 December 1981) was a Peruvian politician. From 1930 to his death he served as leader of the Socialist Party of Peru.

1899 births
1981 deaths
People from Piura Region
Peruvian people of Spanish descent
Socialist Party of Peru (1930) politicians
Members of the Constituent Congress of Peru (1931)
Members of the Chamber of Deputies of Peru
Members of the Senate of Peru